Raebareli Junction railway station is a main railway station in Raebareli district, Uttar Pradesh. Its code is RBL. It serves Raebareli city. The main city station consists of six platforms. It has facilities including water and sanitation.

Raebareli lies on Varanasi–Rae Bareli–Lucknow line and Raebareli–Prayagraj rail line of the Northern Railway. The first railway line Raebareli that featured on Rae Bareli map.

In March 2015, 39 dead, 150 people injured as Varanasi–Dehradun Express derails in Raebareli.

Trains 

 Neelachal Express
 Archana Express
 Yesvantpur–Lucknow Express (via Kacheguda)
 Yesvantpur–Lucknow Express (via Vijayawada)
 Udyognagri Express
 Howrah–Jaisalmer Superfast Express
 Varanasi–Anand Vihar Terminal Garib Rath Express
 Marudhar Express (via Pratapgarh)
 Triveni Express
 Kashi Vishwanath Express
 Allahabad–Haridwar Express
 Ganga Gomti Express
 Ekatmata Express
 Jaunpur–Rae Bareli Express
 Varanasi–Dehradun Express
 Varanasi–Lucknow Intercity Express
 Punjab Mail
 Padmavat Express
 Shaktinagar Terminal–Tanakpur Express
 Malda Town–Anand Vihar Weekly Express
 Rae Bareli–Kanpur Passenger
 Rae Bareli–Raghurajsingh Passenger
 Rae Bareli–Unchahar Passenger
 Saket Link Express
 Prayag–Bareilly Express
 Jaunpur–Rae Bareli Express
 Rae Bareli–Kanpur Passenger (via Unchahar)

Gallery

See also 

 Modern Coach Factory

References

Railway junction stations in Uttar Pradesh
Railway stations in Raebareli district
Lucknow NR railway division
Raebareli